Plainville is a city located in Gordon County, Georgia. The population of Plainville was 313 at the 2010 census, up from 257 at the 2000 census.

History

Plainville was incorporated in 1903. The name is a transfer from Plainville, Connecticut.

Geography

Plainville is located in southwestern Gordon County at  (34.404212, -85.037404). The southern border of the town is the Floyd County line.

Demographics

As of the census of 2000, there were 257 people, 98 households, and 68 families residing in the city. The racial makeup of the city was 97.67% White, 0.39% Native American, and 1.95% from two or more races. Hispanic or Latino of any race were 1.17% of the population.

There were 98 households, out of which 37.8% had children under the age of 18 living with them, 55.1% were married couples living together, 13.3% had a female householder with no husband present, and 29.6% were non-families. 21.4% of all households were made up of individuals, and 7.1% had someone living alone who was 65 years of age or older.  The average household size was 2.62 and the average family size was 3.14.

In the city, the population was spread out, with 26.8% under the age of 18, 11.3% from 18 to 24, 30.7% from 25 to 44, 19.1% from 45 to 64, and 12.1% who were 65 years of age or older.  The median age was 35 years. For every 100 females, there were 107.3 males.  For every 100 females age 18 and over, there were 97.9 males.

The median income for a household in the city was $28,654, and the median income for a family was $30,000. Males had a median income of $25,625 versus $20,875 for females. The per capita income for the city was $14,046.  About 16.3% of families and 18.1% of the population were below the poverty line, including 31.6% of those under the age of eighteen and 16.7% of those 65 or over.

References

Cities in Georgia (U.S. state)
Cities in Gordon County, Georgia